Selma Baccar or Salma Baccar (born December 15, 1945) is a Tunisian filmmaker, producer and politician. She is considered the first woman to make a featured length film in Tunis. Baccar is known for creating manifestos through her films, centered around women's rights in Tunisia.

Early life
Selma Baccar was born on December 15, 1945 in Tunis. Her family moved to Hammam-Lif when she was seven year old. Baccar was raised as a Muslim by her parents and has done the pilgrimage to Mecca with her family twice; however, Baccar identifies as agnostic. She began to study psychology in 1966 to 1968 in Lausanne, Switzerland. She relocated after 2 years to study film in Paris at Institut Francais de Cinema. She then became a member of the Tunisian Federation of Amateur Filmmakers, where she worked as an assistant director for a Tunisian television series.

Career 
At the age of 21, Baccar began to create short films in 1966, along with other women at the Hammam-Lif amateur film club. Her films revolve around women's issues and rights in Tunisia. Her first short film, made in 1966, was a black and white film called L'Eveil, that tackled women's liberation in Tunisia. L'Eveil later received accolades. Baccar directed her first full-length feature film in 1975 titled Fatma 75, this film is considered to be a "pioneer film" in Tunisia. This was the first full-length feature film directed by a woman. Fatma 75, "a feminist essay film about women's roles in Tunisia." The film uses a didactic style film that addresses feminism in Tunisia. The film was banned for several years, due to censorship issues in multiple scenes, by the Tunisian Ministry of information, and was unable to be viewed in commercial movie theatres. Her second full length film, Habiba M’sika (1994), was a biopic of a famous Tunisian singer and dancer, Marguerite Habiba Msika. Flowers of Oblivion told the story of Zakia, an opium addict in a psychiatric hospital in Vichy-ruled Tunisia in the 1940s. The director owns her own production company under Intermedia Productions alongside other notable female directors, to make films and commercials. Baccar also has produced a number of short films.

Baccar's activism for Tunisian women's rights lead her to an active political career; where she became a member of the Al Massar political party. In October 2011, Baccar was elected as a member to the Constituent Assembly In 2014, Baccar became the president of the parliamentary group of Democrats in Tunisia. Baccar was vice-president of the Democratic group, she became "the first and only woman to chair a parliamentary bloc."

Filmography

Featured films
1976: Fatma 75
1994: Habiba M’sika/La Danse du feu/The Dance of Fire
2006: Knochkhach/La Fleur de l'oubli/The Flower of Oblivion 
2017: El Jaida

Other Films

 1966: L'Eveil  (director) (short film)
 1985: De la toison au fil d'or/The Golden Fleece (director) (short film)
1989: Moon Child (Producer) (short film) 
2010: Baydha (Tabou) (Producer) 
2016: Peluche (Producer)

Television series 

1996: Le Secret des métiers
1997 : Femmes dans notre mémoire
2002 : Farhat Lamor (Joie d'une vie)
2005 : Chara Al Hobb
2006 : Nwassi w Ateb
2006 : Assrar âailya
2007 : Chaâbane fi Ramadhane
2007 : Kamanjet Sallema
2007 : Layali el bidh

Awards 

In 1968, L'Eveil, received an award at the Kelibia and Sfax film festivals.
 In 1979, Fatma 75, won the Gold medal at the Mannhiem Film Festival.

Honours 

 2014 : Knight of the National Order of Merit of Tunisia
 2015 : Officier of the Order of the Republic of Tunisia

References

1945 births
Living people
Tunisian women film directors
Tunisian film directors
Tunisian politicians
Tunisian women